Wolfgang Smith (born February 18, 1930 in Vienna, Austria) is a mathematician, physicist, philosopher of science, metaphysician, Roman Catholic and member of the Traditionalist School. He has written extensively in the field of differential geometry, as a critic of scientism and as a proponent of a new interpretation of quantum mechanics that draws heavily from premodern ontology and realism.

Biography
Smith graduated in 1948 from Cornell University with baccalaureate degrees in philosophy, physics, and mathematics. Two years later he obtained his M.S. in physics from Purdue University and, some time later, a Ph.D. in mathematics from Columbia University.

He worked as an aerodynamicist at Bell Aircraft Corporation, and while there researched and published on the problem of atmospheric reentry. He was a mathematics professor at MIT, UCLA and Oregon State University, doing research in the field of differential geometry and publishing in academic journals such as the Transactions of the American Mathematical Society, the Proceedings of the National Academy of Sciences, the American Journal of Mathematics, and others. He retired from academic life in 1992.

In parallel with his academic duties, he developed and still develops philosophical inquiries in the fields of metaphysics and the philosophy of science, publishing in specialized journals such as The Thomist, Sacred Web: A Journal of Tradition and Modernity, and Sophia: The Journal of Traditional Studies.

Philosophical work
Smith is a member of the Traditionalist School of metaphysics, having contributed extensively to its criticism of modernity while exploring the philosophical underpinnings of the scientific method and emphasizing the idea of bringing science back into a Platonist and Aristotelian framework of traditional ontological realism.

Identifying with Alfred North Whitehead's critique of the "bifurcationism" and "physical reductionism" of scientism — i.e., the belief that, first, the qualitative properties of the objects of perception ("corporeal" objects) are ultimately distinct from their respective quantitative properties (the "physical" objects studied by the various sciences); and second, that physical objects are in fact all there is, meaning corporeal objects are reduced to their physical counterparts — Smith examines critically in his work Cosmos and Transcendence (1984) the Cartesian roots of modern science.

Proceeding with his critique of scientism in his monograph, The Quantum Enigma (1995), Smith raises the questions of whether the scientific method is in fact dependent on the scientistic philosophy and, if it is not, whether linking it to other philosophical frameworks would provide better solutions to the way physical phenomena are interpreted. Demonstrating that neither the scientific method nor its results require adhering to a scientistic metaphysics, he answers in the negative to the first question, resulting in the conclusion that it is possible to link the scientific method to any underlying ontology, or to none at all. Working then into the second question, he proposes linking the scientific method — and thus the modern sciences — to a non-bifurcationist, non-reductionist metaphysics in the form of a modified Thomistic ontology, showing how such a move resolves the apparent incoherences of quantum mechanics.

According to Smith, this interpretation of quantum mechanics allows for the usage of the hylomorphic concepts of potency and act to properly understand quantum superposition. For example, instead of considering that a photon is "simultaneously a wave and a particle" or "a particle in two distinct positions," one may consider that the photon (or any other physical object) at first does not exist in act, but only in potency; i.e., as "matter" in the hylomorphic meaning of the term, having the potential of becoming "a wave or a particle," or "of being here or there." Whether one of these outcomes will happen to this undifferentiated matter is dependent on the determination imposed upon it by the macroscopic corporeal object that provides its actualization. A photon, thus, would be no more strange for having many potentials than, say, an individual who has the "superposed" potentials of learning French and/or Spanish and/or Greek, all the while reading and/or walking and/or stretching his arms. A further consequence of this interpretation is that a corporeal object and its "associated physical object" are not dichotomized or reduced one to the other anymore but, on the contrary, altogether constitute a whole of which different aspects are dealt with depending upon perspective.

Smith's understanding of the relationship between corporeal and physical objects extends to his interpretation of biology, where he has become an opponent of Darwinian evolution, as the fundamental element in a species would be its form, not its causal history, which evolutionists favor. This leads him to be a supporter of the intelligent design movement, though his own hylomorphic approach is not widely adopted by mainstream intelligent design theorists (who, like evolutionists, also favor causal history, albeit differently).

Smith has also taken a stance towards a relativistic rehabilitation of geocentrism. He does not support a Ptolemaic or medieval geocentrism unequivocally, nor assert that heliocentrism is absolutely false. Rather, he argues that, according to the theory of relativity, both heliocentrism and geocentrism have scientific merit, insofar as scientific observation depends upon the reference frame of the observer. Consequently, any observations made from Earth (or any near-Earth satellites) are in effect geocentric.

Filmography 
Smith participated in Miracle (2019), a documentary by Mauro Ventura, with the participation of Raphael De Paola and Olavo de Carvalho.

The End of Quantum Reality (2020), a documentary film about Smith's life and thought, ran in a limited national theatrical release in the U.S.

Select bibliography

Books 

Cosmos and Transcendence: Breaking Through the Barrier of Scientistic Belief (1984)

 Theistic Evolution: The Teilhardian Heresy (1988; originally published as Teilhardism and the New Religion)

The Quantum Enigma: Finding the Hidden Key (1995)

Ancient Wisdom and Modern Misconceptions: A Critique of Contemporary Scientism (2003; originally published as The Wisdom of Ancient Cosmology)

Christian Gnosis: From Saint Paul to Meister Eckhart (2008)

Science & Myth: With a Response to Stephen Hawking's The Grand Design (2012)

In Quest of Catholicity: Malachi Martin Responds to Wolfgang Smith (2016)

Physics and Vertical Causation: The End of Quantum Reality (2019)

The Vertical Ascent: From Particles to the Tripartite Cosmos and Beyond (2021)

Vedanta in Light of Christian Wisdom (2022)

Physics: A Science in Quest of an Ontology (2023)

Articles

General 
Articles on philosophy, religion, physics and non-mathematical subjects in general:

I belive

Mathematics
Academic articles on mathematics signed as "J. Wolfgang Smith":

See also

 Quantum mechanics
 Philosophy of science
 Philosophy of physics
 Interpretation of quantum mechanics
 Philosophical realism
 Perennial philosophy
 Traditionalist School
List of American philosophers

Notes

References

 

 

 

 

 

20th-century American philosophers
20th-century American mathematicians
21st-century American mathematicians
21st-century American physicists
Cornell University alumni
Differential geometers
Catholic philosophers
Philosophers of religion
Philosophers of science
Thomists
Metaphysicians
Philosophical realism
Traditionalist School
Oregon State University faculty
Massachusetts Institute of Technology School of Science faculty
University of California, Los Angeles faculty
1930 births
Living people